Tristan Leavitt is an American attorney who is the president of Empower Oversight as of March 2023. He formerly served in several roles at the Merit Systems Protection Board, including member, acting chair, and general counsel.

Early life and education
Originally from Idaho Falls, Idaho, Leavitt earned a Bachelor of Arts degree in political science from Brigham Young University in 2007. At BYU, he was student body vice-president. He later earned a Juris Doctor degree from Georgetown University.

Career

Early career
After graduating from BYU, Leavitt was hired as an intern in the office of Congressman Bill Sali, where he later was promoted to staff assistant. He then interned at Human Rights Without Frontiers before working on the staff of the United States House Committee on Oversight and Reform, the Senate Judiciary Committee, and as principal deputy special counsel and acting special counsel at the United States Office of Special Counsel.

Merit Systems Protection Board
In October 2018, Leavitt was appointed general counsel of the Merit Systems Protection Board. On February 28, 2019, the term of the only remaining member of the three-person MSPB expired, leaving the board with no members. Leavitt then assumed unitary control of the board's non-exclusive functions in accordance with continuity of government plans the board had enacted the last time it had members.

On September 2, 2021, President Joe Biden nominated Leavitt to serve as a member of the MSPB. Leavitt was confirmed on March 1, 2022 and took office three days later on March 4. He served until the expiration of his term on February 28, 2023.

Personal life
Leavitt is married and has five children. He met his wife while both were attending BYU.

In 2013, he served as president of the BYU Political Affairs Society, a networking group of BYU alumni sponsored by the BYU department of political science.

References

Brigham Young University alumni
Georgetown University alumni
Living people
People from Idaho Falls, Idaho
Year of birth missing (living people)